Kalamegam is a 1940 Tamil-language film directed by Ellis R. Dungan and starring nadaswaram player T. N. Rajarathnam Pillai. This was the second film as script writer for the Tamil rationalist poet Bharathidasan. This was the only film in which Pillai acted in his life.

Plot

Kalamegam is based on the life of 15th century Tamil poet Kalamegam.

Cast 

Male cast
 "All India Nadaswara Vidwan" T. N. Rajarathnam as Varadan, Kalamegam
 N. S. Krishnan as Kittu
 C. V. V. Panthulu as Adimadura Kavi
 Kali N. Rathnam as Poet Kanda
 M. V. Mani as Poet Muthu
 M. S. Muthukrishnan as Singaram
 S. Murugesan as King Thirumalai Rayan
 Master T. V. Namasivayam as Prince
 Joker Ramudu as Kamalakannan
 Kunjithapadam Pillai as Poet Kunjitha
 K. R. Venugopala Sarma as Old Nattuvanar
 K. S. Muthaiah Bhagavathar as Devi Devotee
 Ramamirtha Chozhaganar as Village Chief

Female cast
 S. P. L. Dhanalakshmi as Mohangi
 T. A. Madhuram as Anjugam
 P. R. Mangalam as Poet Kanda’s Wife
 P. S. Gnanam as Veeri
 T. N. Rajalakshmi as Devi
 T. M. Pattammal as Female Dancer
 N. K. Periya Papu as Rathnam
 K. Subbulakshmi as Amudham
 G. S. Saraswathi as Kalyani
 M. R. Saraswathi as Pachai
 S. R. Meenatchi as Dasi
 K. T. Dhanalakshmi as Dasi
 Baby Chittamani Rajalakshmi as Veeri’s Foster Girl
 Manonmani Ammal as Mohana’s Mother

Support cast
R. S. Ramu, Natarajan, M. A. Pichai Pandurar, T. Thangaiah, A. Sivakozhundhu, C. G. Nammazhvar Reddiar, Ramasami Pillai, and Sundarabhashyam Naidu.

Production 
Dungan was hired to direct a film based on the life of the 15th century Tamil poet Kalamega Pulavar. Nadaswaram Maestro T. N. Rajarathnam Pillai was cast in the title role as poet Kalamegam. The script was written by the rationalist poet Puduvai Bharathidasan. To satisfy Rajarathnam Pillai's fans, scenes with Kalamegam playing the Nadaswaram were added to the film. Dharmapuri S. Murugesan who was one sixth partner of Mohini Pictures acted as the Raja Thirumalia Naiker in front of whom TNR played the nadhaswaram. C.V.V Panthulu and another minister were sitting in the dharbar. S. P. L. Dhanalakshmi was cast as Mohangi and the comedy parts were played by N. S. Krishnan, T. A. Madhuram and Kali N. Rathnam. According to the Kalamegam legend, he cursed a village to be destroyed in a sandstorm. Dungan filmed some of the sandstorm scenes on location and shot the remaining scenes using large sized miniatures constructed on the Elliot's Beach in Madras. The completed film was 18,986 feet in length. The film was produced at Prag Jyothi Motion Pictures.

Songs 
The music was composed by R. N. Chinnaiah and the lyrics were written by Puduvai Bharathidasan.

Orchestra
 R. N. Chinnaiah – Harmonium
 M. V. Santhanamaiah – Harmonium
 V. Govindasami – Fiddle
 R. N. Thambi – Veena
 K. V. Naidu – Mridangam
 C. Kuppusami Naidu – Clarinet
 Sadhu Ganapathi Sastri – Jalatharangam
 Bande Khan Saheb – Sarangi
 J. Ramakrishna Rao – Organ
 Nagaiah – Flute
 T. S. Mani – Bulbulthara
 N. Parthasarathy Naidu – Saxophone

Reception
The film was released on 17 May 1940 and was a box office failure. But the sandstorm scenes were well received by the audience. The film is lost, with the only known surviving artefacts being stills and 78 rpm-song discs.

References

External links

1940 films
1940s Tamil-language films
Films directed by Ellis R. Dungan
Lost Indian films